Ireland is one of the nations competing at the inaugural 2018 European Championships in Berlin, Germany and Glasgow, United Kingdom, from 2 to 12 August 2018. Ireland is competing in 7 sports.

Medallists

|  style="text-align:left; width:78%; vertical-align:top;"|

|  style="text-align:left; width:22%; vertical-align:top;"|

See also
Ireland at the 2018 European Athletics Championships

References

External links
 European Championships official site 

2018
Nations at the 2018 European Championships
2018 in Irish sport